Mandara is an ethnic group and a language family in West Africa. 
It is also an alternative spelling of "mandarah", referring to a guest room in Middle Eastern buildings, especially in Egypt. 

Additionally, it may refer to:

West Africa 
 Mandara languages is one of the group of Chadic languages
 Mandara Kingdom of Cameroon
 Mandara Mountains of Cameroon
 Mandara people, also called the Mandrawa, of northern Cameroon and northeastern Nigeria

Other 
 El Mandara, a neighbourhood in Alexandria, Egypt
 Bali Mandara Toll Road, an elevated toll road in Bali, Indonesia
 Mandara or Mandala, Hindu and Buddhist religious object or symbol
 Mandara people (Australia), an Australian Aboriginal tribe
 Mandara tree, the legume Erythrina stricta
 Mandaraba tree, the Indian Coral Tree (Erythrina variegata)
 The crown flower plant Calotropis gigantea
 Mount Mandara, a mythical mountain in the Hindu Puranas
 Mandara (TV series), a German television series
 Mandara language, an Austronesian language spoken on the Tabar Group of islands, New Ireland Province, Papua New Guinea
 Mandara Spa, a global spa management company founded in Bali and now under the company Steiner Leisure Limited

See also
Mandala (disambiguation)
Mandar (disambiguation)